The following is an incomplete list of famous French naval battles from the Middle Ages to modern France.

French
Naval battles involving France